Lewisham is a National Rail and Docklands Light Railway station in Lewisham, south-east London which first opened in 1849.

Station layout
There are four platforms for main-line trains: 3 and 4 on the North Kent Line, and 1 and 2 on the Mid-Kent line which is also used as a loop off the South Eastern Main Line. 

The current station which dates from 1857 is constructed of yellow stock brick with stone dressing and has an unusual survival of a wooden clapboard building at the back. The facade has a pleasing symmetry of three windows, three entrance doors, and three windows.

Original doors sash windows skirting tiling and banisters are present inside. The original corniced ceiling of the main hall is currently concealed by a lowered fake ceiling. Platform 3 has kept its original canopy with its elaborate cast iron brackets which depict cherries. some of the original chamfered wood and cast iron supports of the original canopy survive on platform 2.

The station has similarities with other listed stations built at around the same time such as the listed Ladywell railway station, Blackheath station and Gravesend railway station which has the same elaborate cast iron supporting brackets as can be found at Lewisham.

Platforms 5 and 6 are served by Docklands Light Railway trains to Bank and Stratford. The Docklands Light Railway station opened in 1999 following a southward extension from Island Gardens.
The original canopy over platform 4 was demolished at some point post 1990.

The original canopy over the main entrance was demolished in 2009 at a cost of £790k and replaced with a steel version. 

From December 2009, Lewisham was fitted with electric ticket gates, in line with the Government's new strategy to give all Greater London National Rail stations Oyster card accessibility and closing access to those who attempt to travel without tickets. This was controversial as it involved the closure of the gate on Platform 4 and led to a petition signed by over 1,000.

British Transport Police also maintains a neighbourhood policing presence at Lewisham.

History

Opening and early years (1849–1922)
The North Kent line opened on 30 July 1849 by the South Eastern Railway linking Strood with the London and Greenwich Railway route to London Bridge. The original station was located east of the Lewisham Road overbridge with access off Lewisham Road.

With the opening of the Mid-Kent line on 1 January 1857 a new station was built to the west so both lines could be served. For a period Old Lewisham Station was also kept open

Eleven passengers were killed in the 1857 Lewisham rail crash when a train ran into the back of a stationary train.

In 1898 the South Eastern Railway and the London Chatham and Dover Railway agreed to work as one railway company under the name of the South Eastern and Chatham Railway.

Southern Railway (1923–1947)
Following the Railways Act 1921 (also known as the Grouping Act), Lewisham became a Southern Railway station on 1 January 1923.

The Mid-Kent line was electrified with services commencing on 28 February 1926.

The North Kent Line was electrified with the (750 V DC third rail) system. Electrification was initially to Dartford (6 June 1926) and was extended to Gillingham by World War Two.

In 1929 large-scale remodelling of the junction was undertaken to enable cross-London freight traffic to be routed via Nunhead and Loughborough Junction. The new route utilised part of the former Greenwich Park branch (which had closed in 1917) and included a flyover.

The loop between Lewisham and the main line towards Hither Green, which had opened in 1929, was electrified on 16 July 1933 allowing Sidcup and Orpington local electric services to call.

The Nunhead line was electrified in summer 1935 and opened to electric traffic on 30 September 1935 with services from the Bexleyheath and Sidcup to St Paul's (today Blackfriars). This service was cancelled during World War 2 as an economy measure recommencing on 12 August 1946.

British Railways (1948–1994)

After World War II and following nationalisation on 1 January 1948, it fell under the auspices of British Railways Southern Region.

On 4 December 1957 the Lewisham rail crash occurred to the west of the station with 90 fatalities.

As part of the London Bridge re-signalling a new loop line was opened with a reversible track down to the west (Fast Line) side of St Johns which opened up on 1 April 1976.

Upon sectorisation in 1982, three passenger sectors were created: Provincial (later renamed Regional Railways) for local services outside of the London area; InterCity, operating principal express services; and London & South East (renamed Network SouthEast in 1986) who operated commuter services in the London area.

Franchise (1994–present day)

Following de-nationalisation of British Rail on 1 April 1994 the infrastructure to St Johns station became the responsibility of Railtrack whilst a business unit operated the train services. On 13 October 1996 operation of the passenger services passed to Connex South Eastern who were originally due to run the franchise until 2011.

On 22 November 1999 Deputy Prime Minister John Prescott opened the 4·2 km Lewisham extension of London's Docklands Light Railway with trains running through to Bank.

Following a number of accidents and financial issues Railtrack plc was sold to Network Rail on 3 October 2002 who became responsible for the infrastructure.

On 27 June 2003 the Strategic Rail Authority decided to strip Connex of the franchise citing poor financial management and run the franchise itself. Connex South Eastern continued to operate the franchise until 8 November 2003 with the services transferring to the Strategic Rail Authority's South Eastern Trains subsidiary the following day.

On 30 November 2005 the Department for Transport awarded Govia the Integrated Kent franchise. The services operated by South Eastern Trains transferred to Southeastern on 1 April 2006.

The loop line to St Johns was doubled in 2013.

There was formerly a bus terminus within the station, but this was relocated to Thurston Road as part of the Lewisham Gateway project.

Incidents
On 4 December 1957, the Lewisham rail crash occurred to the west of the station with 90 fatalities. A plaque at the station commemorates this incident.
In the early morning hours of 24 January 2017, a GB Railfreight train travelling from Grain to Neasden derailed at Lewisham.  Although no railway workers or passengers were injured in the derailment, it caused widespread disruption across the Southeastern system, with numerous delays and cancellations for the day.
On the evening of 2 March 2018 during exceptionally cold weather, several trains were delayed close to the station and passengers evacuated the train and went onto the tracks.

Planned London Underground services

Fleet line service 
In 1971 and 1972, parliamentary approval was given for construction of Phases 2 and 3 of the planned Fleet line. Phase 3 on the proposal would have extended the line from Fenchurch Street to Lewisham, with new platforms constructed underground. Further plans for Phase 4 of the extension considered the line taking over the mainline tracks on the Addiscombe and Hayes branch lines. Preliminary construction works were carried out elsewhere on the extension before the plan was postponed by lack of funds. Following a change of name to Jubilee line, the first part of the line opened in 1979, but the remaining plans were not carried out. When the Jubilee line was extended in 1999, a different route to Stratford was followed.

Bakerloo line service 
TfL is currently considering extending the Bakerloo line to Lewisham. Both line options stop at Lewisham. If progressed the station is currently expected to open in 2030.

In its draft Kent Route Utilisation Strategy, Network Rail mentions the possibility of extending the Bakerloo line from Elephant & Castle to Lewisham, and then taking over the Hayes branch line. Network Rail states that this would free up six paths per hour into central London and so increasing capacity on the Tonbridge main line, which would also relieve the junctions around Lewisham.

Services
Lewisham is the southern terminus of the DLR, the previous station being Elverson Road. It is on the boundary of Travelcard Zone 2 and Zone 3 and is a major transport hub, with many buses passing through or terminating here.

During infrastructure works on the Greenwich Line, Thameslink services are normally diverted through Lewisham, giving it a temporary link to Luton in the north and Rainham in the east.

National Rail

The typical off-peak service in trains per hour is:

 6 tph to London Charing Cross (non-stop to )
 4 tph to London Cannon Street (all stations)
 2 tph to 
 2 tph to  via 
 2 tph to  via 
 2 tph to  via 
 2 tph to  via , continuing to London Cannon Street via  and 
 2 tph to Dartford via Bexleyheath 
 2 tph to  via Woolwich Arsenal

Additional trains serve the station during the peak hours.

Docklands Light Railway
The typical DLR service in trains per hour is:
 12tph to Bank via Greenwich, Canary Wharf and Limehouse

Connections

London Buses routes 21, 47, 75, 89, 129, 136, 178, 181, 185, 199, 208, 225, 261, 273, 284, 321, 380, 436, 484, P4, school route 621 and night routes N21, N89, N136 and N199 serve the station.

Lewisham previously had an adjoining bus station for terminating routes. The station closed on 28 February 2014 for the major Lewisham Gateway redevelopment project.

References

External links

 Docklands Light Railway website - Lewisham station page

Docklands Light Railway stations in the London Borough of Lewisham
Railway stations in the London Borough of Lewisham
DfT Category C2 stations
Former South Eastern Railway (UK) stations
Railway stations in Great Britain opened in 1849
Railway stations served by Southeastern
1849 establishments in England